The Mavilla River is a river of Naranjito,  Vega Alta, and Corozal in Puerto Rico.

See also
 Mavilla Bridge: NRHP listing between Bayamón and Corozal, Puerto Rico
 List of rivers of Puerto Rico

References

External links
 USGS Hydrologic Unit Map – Caribbean Region (1974)
 Ríos de Puerto Rico 

Rivers of Puerto Rico